Grossoseta is a genus of flat-footed flies (insects in the family Platypezidae). There are at least two described species in Grossoseta.

Species
These two species belong to the genus Grossoseta:
Grossoseta johnsoni (Kessel, 1961)
Grossoseta pacifica (Kessel, 1948)
Data sources: i = ITIS, c = Catalogue of Life, g = GBIF, b = Bugguide.net

References

Further reading

 

Platypezidae
Articles created by Qbugbot
Platypezoidea genera